Belmont Provincial Park is a provincial park in Prince Edward Island, Canada. It is located on the coast of Malpeque Bay.

References

Provincial parks of Prince Edward Island
Parks in Prince County, Prince Edward Island